John A. Pritzker (born 1953), the grandson of A.N. Pritzker and son of Jay Pritzker, is an American billionaire and investor. He is a member of the Pritzker family.

Early life and education
Pritzker was born in Chicago, Illinois, the son of Marian "Cindy" (née Friend) and Jay Pritzker.  Pritzker graduated with a B.A. from Menlo College. His father diversified the Chicago-based family business, the Marmon Group - along with his brothers Robert Pritzker and Donald Pritzker - building it into a portfolio of over 60 diversified industrial corporations. He also created the Hyatt Hotel chain in 1957 and owned Braniff Airlines from 1983–1988. The family has been divesting its assets: in 2006, the family sold Conwood, a smokeless tobacco company, for $3.5 billion to cigarette company Reynolds American Inc; in 2007, the family sold control of the Marmon Group to Warren Buffett's Berkshire Hathaway for $4.5 billion; and in 2010, the family sold its majority stake in Transunion, the Chicago-based credit reporting company, for an undisclosed amount to Chicago-based private-equity firm Madison Dearborn Partners.

Career
In 1972, Pritzker started his career working in the family business, Hyatt Hotels, where in 1984, he rose to become Managing Director and Divisional Vice President. In 1988, he left Hyatt to pursue his own entrepreneurial activities, including Ticketmaster. In 1996, he formed Mandara Spa, a chain of 72 resort spas. In 2000, 40% of the company was sold to Shiseido Co. In 2001, the remaining 60% was sold to Steiner Leisure Limited, a Nasdaq (STNR) listed company. In 2005, Pritzker founded the private equity firm Geolo Capital with his Mandara business partner Tom Gottlieb; Geolo Capital focused on investments in hospitality, entertainment, and health & wellness companies.  In 2009, Geolo Capital bought the iconic Carmel Valley Ranch from Blackstone. The resort was reimagined and opened in 2012. Soon after the resort's opening, Geolo Capital purchased a majority interest in the Joie de Vivre boutique hotel chain. In October 2011, Geolo Capital merged the 30 hotel Joie de Vivre chain with the 12 hotel Thompson Hotel Group to form Commune Hotels & Resorts with Pritzker and Jason Pomeranc serving as co-CEOS. In 2012, Commune operated 46 hotels, which generated $450 million in revenues. In January 2016, Commune Hotels merged with Destination Hotels to form Two Roads Hospitality.  With that merger, the new company had over 97 hotels across six brands and annual revenues of over $2.3 billion. In November 2018, Two Roads Hospitality closed on its sale to Hyatt Corporation for a reported price of $480 million.

Personal life and philanthropy
Pritzker and his former wife Lisa Stone have three children. He is the chair of the John Pritzker Family Fund, which invests in mental health and healthcare, democracy and civic health, Jewish life and the arts. The fund is a major supporter of the Department of Psychiatry and Behavioral Science at the University of California San Francisco (UCSF), wherethe JPFF funded the construction of the UCSF Nancy Friend Pritzker Building for Psychiatry and the Pritzker Center for Photography at the San Francisco Museum of Modern Art. He serves on the Executive Committee of the Metropolitan Museum of Art and the Executive Council of UCSF Health.

Pritzker serves on the board of the Bernard Osher Foundation, is a member of the Emeritus Board of Tipping Point Community and is a past president of the San Francisco Jewish Community Federation.

References

American people of Ukrainian-Jewish descent
American billionaires
Menlo College alumni
John
1953 births
Living people
American hoteliers
21st-century American Jews